FK TJ Štěchovice is a Czech football club located in Štěchovice. It currently plays in the Regional Championship - Prague - west, which is the fifth tier of the Czech football system.

History
The club was officially founded in 1926 and it started play in lower tiers after the World War II.

The club won the regional championship in 2011, gaining promotion to the Czech Fourth Division. The team placed second in Division A, part of the Czech Fourth Division, in the 2012–13 season. From season 2012–13 to 2019-20 Štěchovice played in the Bohemian Football League. Since 2020–21 season it plays in the  Regional Championship - Prague - west.

Czech Cup
The club played in the 2013–14 Czech Cup, reaching the second round before losing 4–1 against FK Dukla Prague.

References

External links
 Official website 

Football clubs in the Czech Republic
Association football clubs established in 1926
Prague-West District
1926 establishments in Czechoslovakia